Still Life  is a 2013 drama film written and directed by Uberto Pasolini. The film was presented at the 70th Venice Film Festival , where it won the award for Best Director in the category "Orizzonti". At the Reykjavik International Film Festival, Still Life received the top award (Golden Puffin) as well as the FIPRESCI Award. It also received the Black Pearl award (the highest award) at the Abu Dhabi Film Festival for "its humanity, empathy and grace in treating grief, solitude and death"; for his performance, Eddie Marsan won the Best British Actor award at the 2014 Edinburgh International Film Festival.

Plot
John May is a man struggling with loneliness who works the Bona Vacantia office in the Kennington Town Hall in London, where his main responsibility is locating the next of kin of people found dead in the district with no will and testament. Most cases are open-and-shut due to lack of leads, but when heirs are located, he regularly finds them hesitant to organise funerals for the deceased and so has taken to the practice of organising the funerals, writing eulogies for each deceased and attending the funerals himself, usually as the only mourner. His boss finds this practice time-consuming and expensive and so has decided to close his office down once he completes one final case: the death of William "Billy" Stoke. When Mr. May, as he is called throughout the story, asks the man's address, he finds out that the deceased was a neighbour he never knew, who lived directly across the apartment building from him, in direct view of his window.

Inspecting Stoke's apartment, his sole lead is a series of photographs, one of them being of a pork pie factory. Most of the photographs are of an adult woman and a young girl. The many photos of the young girl stop abruptly; there are empty pages in the album and no photos of a girl much older than ten. John surmises that Stoke once had a wife and daughter, but there are no records or leads, no names, dates or labels, no identification of any kind.

He visits the pie factory and finds one of the workers who was friends with Stoke at the time. He asks the man if he had ever spoken of a wife or daughter to which the man replies that Stoke had never spoken of a family and that he left the factory for a lady who owned a fish and chips restaurant that Stoke frequented. John travels to where Stoke was living at the time and checks all the fish and chip shops in town until he locates Stoke's former lover, Mary, her adult daughter, and granddaughter. Mary discloses that Stoke is the father of her daughter, but that he left before he knew of her existence.

Mary tells John that they cannot be considered Stoke's kin as "he never wanted a family." She does, however, tell him that after Stokes abandoned her he probably landed himself in prison.

John manages to locate the prison Stoke was incarcerated at. At the prison a guard leads John to some letters Stoke never mailed where he finds a letter from the young girl in the photo album, making it apparent that she is a daughter who was once part of Stoke's life and family. It contains the name "Kelly" and an address. Another involved search is fruitful: May finds Kelly Stoke, Stoke's other daughter, the daughter he knew. Kelly is taken aback to hear her father is dead, but shows hard feelings from her father's wild ways and his abandonment of her and her mother when she was young. Kelly discloses that her mother, the woman in the photo album and Stoke's former wife, had died three years ago.

When May invites Kelly to the funeral, she displays hurt and resentment that are strong enough for her to decline. She gives him a photo of her father with Jumbo, taken when they were serving in the military in the Falklands. Jumbo remembers Stoke fondly but shows no interest in the funeral. Jumbo refers John to several parks and shelters where he had seen Stoke last. There John meets two homeless men there who agree to talk to him in exchange for a drink. However, they too show no interest in the funeral. Considering this the end of the line, John returns to his office to ready it for decommissioning. He receives a phone call there from Kelly who has accepted to be Stoke's next of kin.

The later part of the film shows quiet scenes that depict John making small changes in his rigid routine: trying new foods and drinks, walking new routes and being inspired by a story of Billy Stoke's bravado.

John meets with Kelly to inform her of what she has inherited and enthusiastically discusses the funeral arrangements he has made for Stokes, including allocating his grave on John's favourite resting spot in the cemetery. Kelly invites John to join her for tea after the funeral, which makes John smile for the first time in the film, under the promise that his loneliness will end. After shopping for some small gifts, he is hit by a New Routemaster bus and bleeds to death on the asphalt.

However, there is no one to locate his next of kin, since the office has closed down. No one shows up to his funeral. He is buried in an unmarked grave very close to Stoke's at the same time that Stoke's funeral is in progress.

Stoke's funeral is attended by all the people John contacted throughout the film on his behalf; Stoke's military mates in their dress berets, the homeless men, his former girlfriend and his two daughters and grandchild.  Kelly occasionally looks around for John but does not recognise his coffin as it passes by. As Stoke's funeral party leaves Kelly looks over and sees attendants putting the last dirt on a new grave, again not knowing that it is John's.

After May's funeral attendants depart, the ghost of Billy Stoke and of the other people whose cases John worked on while he was still alive begin to appear in the cemetery en masse and walk towards John's grave.

Cast
Eddie Marsan as John May
Joanne Froggatt as Kelly Stoke
Andrew Buchan as Mr Pratchett
Neil D'Souza as Shakthi
Paul Anderson as  Homeless
Tim Potter as: Homeless
Ciaran McIntyre as Jumbo

Remake
A Japanese remake of Still Life, titled I Am Makimoto, is set for release in September 2022.

References

External links
 

2013 drama films
2013 films
British drama films
Italian drama films
Films scored by Rachel Portman
2010s English-language films
2010s British films